The Los Angeles Tribune was a newspaper published in  by Almena Lomax, a civil rights activist,  between 1941 and 1960, for principally the African-American residents of Los Angeles. The paper was known for its "fearless reporting," including articles about racism in the Los Angeles Police Department.  Just after World War II, Hisaye Yamamoto wrote for the paper.

Edna P. Harris was an editor and writer for the Tribune. She wrote  about racist policies like segregation of blood supplies, immigration, and the internment of Japanese Americans during World War II.

References 

Newspapers published in Greater Los Angeles
African-American newspapers
Defunct African-American newspapers
1941 establishments in California
1960 disestablishments in California
Newspapers established in the 1940s
Publications disestablished in 1960